Jim McDowell is a lawyer and defence sector businessman based in South Australia. He is the Chief Executive Officer of Nova Systems; a global engineering services and technology solutions company. Prior to joining Nova Systems in November 2020, McDowell was the Chief Executive of the Department of the Premier and Cabinet of the Government of South Australia. He is a former CEO of BAE Systems Australia and BAE Systems Saudi Arabia.

Early life
McDowell went to school in Belfast, Northern Ireland and university in England. He graduated with honours in law from the University of Warwick in 1977.

Career 
McDowell worked in legal, commercial and marketing roles with aerospace company Bombardier Shorts for 18 years after graduation.

In 1996 McDowell left Bombardier Shorts and joined British Aerospace in their Singapore office. Three years later, following the merger of British Aerospace and Marconi Electronic Systems, he was appointed Regional managing director of BAE Systems for Asia. In March 2001 he was appointed as Chief Executive of BAE Systems Australia. Under his leadership, the company expanded to become Australia's largest defense firm, with more than 6,500 employees and annual sales of approximately AUD $1.7 billion. He oversaw a significant expansion of BAE's Australian operations and established the company's headquarters in Adelaide, South Australia. He ran operations from Adelaide until September 2011 when he was tasked to lead BAE Saudi Arabia. In 2011, David Allott replaced McDowell as Chief Executive of BAE Systems Australia.

In 2014 McDowell left BAE Systems Saudi Arabia and returned to Adelaide, marking a career shift from the private to the public sector. During a total of 38 years in the defense, aerospace and technology sector he lived and worked in the United Kingdom, the United States, Korea, Singapore, Hong Kong and the Kingdom of Saudi Arabia. He returned to the private sector in 2020 and is the current Chief Executive Officer of Nova Systems based in Adelaide.

Chancellor of the University of South Australia 

On 1 January 2016, McDowell replaced Dr Ian Gould as Chancellor of the University of South Australia. McDowell had previously served on its Council from 2007 and on its Business School Advisory Board and the Law School Advisory Board from 2010.

He resigned as Chancellor in 2018 and became the Chief Executive of the Department of Premier and Cabinet.

Governance Roles 
McDowell served as Chair on a range of boards including the Australian Nuclear Science and Technology Organisation and was first appointed Deputy Chair in March 2014. He was also Chair of private company Total Construction Pty Ltd, and non-executive director of public companies Codan Ltd , Austal Ltd and Micro – X Ltd.

In 2015, McDowell was a member of the Expert Advisory Panel on the Future Submarine Competitive Evaluation Process, formed by the Australian Government. McDowell's contract was valued at $275,000 for 50 days' work and included travel expenses. Concern was expressed regarding the remuneration for the advisory panel members by independent senator Nick Xenophon.

In April 2017, McDowell was appointed as a director of the Adelaide Football Club.

McDowell was a director of the RAA and remains a member of The Australian Strategic Policy Institute Council and is on the Council of Governors at St. Peter's College.

Honours

On 24 April 2019 McDowell was awarded an honorary doctorate (D.Univ. Honoris Causa ) by the University of South Australia.

References 

Chancellors of the University of South Australia
Living people
Year of birth missing (living people)